The following is an episode list of the television series Police Camera Action! The programme is presented by Alastair Stewart (1994–2009), Adrian Simpson (2007–2009) and Gethin Jones (2010).

Overview
Blocks of episodes with the same colour scheme indicate the opening titles used in this particular series.

Episode list

Pilots (1994-1995)

Series 1 (1995)

Series 2 (1996)

Series 3 (1996-1997)

Series 4 (1997)

Series 5 (1997-1998)

Series 6 (1998)

Specials (1999)

Series 7 (2000)

Series 8 (2000)

Series 9 (2001)

Specials (2002)

Series 10 (2006)
This series was originally filmed in 2002, but was not broadcast at the time following Alastair Stewart's conviction for drink driving. The series was eventually broadcast in 2006, exclusively on ITV4. This series was also the last series to be presented primarily by Stewart.

Series 11 (2007)
This series was broadcast on Monday nights at 9:00pm, before moving to a 9:00pm slot on Thursdays midway through the series.

Series 12 (2008)
This series was first broadcast on ITV4, with episodes later being repeated in the graveyard slot on ITV1. This was also the last series to be presented by Stewart. It was also the first and only series to be broadcast daily.

Series 13 (2008)
This series was presented solely by Simpson, and was the first series to be of an hour-long format. Most of the clips in this series had previously been broadcast in other episodes. This was the last series to be presented by Simpson.

Series 14 (2010)
This was the first and only series to be presented by Gethin Jones. This series also adopted a more documentary-like feel, rather than containing mostly clips like the previous series did. It continued the hour-long format previously adopted in Series 13.

Notes

References

External links

Lists of British non-fiction television series episodes